Alfred Carroll Richmond (18 January 1902 – 15 March 1984) was an admiral of the United States Coast Guard who served as the 11th Commandant of the United States Coast Guard from 1954 to 1962, the second longest tenure of any U.S. Coast Guard Commandant following Russell R. Waesche who served from 1936 to 1946.

Early life
Richmond was born 18 January 1902 in Waterloo, Iowa, and moved to Cherrydale neighborhood of Arlington, Virginia, with his family at the age of ten. After receiving a high school certificate from Massanutten Military Academy in Woodstock, Virginia, he entered the College of Engineering at George Washington University at the age of 16. While a student at George Washington University, he was employed at the United States Naval Observatory. He graduated from GWU in 1922, the same year he was appointed as a cadet at the United States Coast Guard Academy in New London, Connecticut.

Early career
Upon graduating from the Academy in 1924, with senior man honors, he was commissioned as an ensign on 1 October 1924  and assigned as an aide to Commandant Frederick C. Billard until September 1926 when he was appointed to the Coast Guard Academy staff. On 1 October 1926 he was promoted to lieutenant (junior grade). While at the Academy he participated in cadet summer practice cruises in 1927 aboard  and in 1928 aboard . On 1 October 1928 Richmond was promoted to lieutenant and assigned as a student at Sperry Gyro Compass School at Brooklyn, New York. Upon graduation he was assigned a navigator aboard USCGC Pontchartrain, a newly delivered Lake-class cutter built at the Bethlehem Shipbuilding Corporation yards at Quincy, Massachusetts. In July 1930 he was transferred to USCGC Wainwright as the executive officer but was assigned in November to be the Coast Guard Representative at the Philadelphia Navy Yard while the USCGC Herndon was being readied for Rum Patrol duty. In May 1932, Richmond was reassigned to Coast Guard Headquarters with the assignment of assembling a Coast Guard marksmanship team at Camp Curtis Guild, Massachusetts that would compete at National Rifle Association matches held at Fort Sheridan, Illinois. After returning to Headquarters in August he was assigned as executive officer of  patrolling the waters of the Bering Sea and the Arctic Ocean. The newly reporting executive officer was promoted to lieutenant commander on 16 October 1932 and he continued to serve in that billet until being reassigned once again to Coast Guard Headquarters in September 1935. While working at headquarters, he enrolled at his alma mater, George Washington University as a law student. He graduated "with distinction" on 8 June 1938 with a Juris Doctor degree. The Coast Guard put Richmond's legal education to immediate use by assigning him duties in preparing law enforcement educational materials and assisting the Coast Guard Engineer-in-Chief with land records for property used by the Coast Guard. As the Coast Guard's first legal specialist he assisted in writing regulations for the recently formed Coast Guard Auxiliary, which at the time was known as the Coast Guard Reserve.
 During July 1939 he served as a representative of the Department of the Treasury and a delegate of the United States at the International Whaling Conference held at London, England.

World War II service
In May 1941, Richmond was transferred to the Bethlehem Shipbuilding yard at Baltimore, Maryland, to supervise the outfitting of the new Coast Guard training vessel American Sailor, which was to be used for the training of U.S. Maritime Service personnel. He became the commanding officer when American Sailor was commissioned on 22 July 1941 and sailed her to the Maritime Service Training Station at Port Hueneme, California, where he also assumed command of the school in February 1942. Richmond was promoted to commander on 17 July 1942 while stationed at Port Hueneme. With the termination of Coast Guard control of Maritime Service ships on 1 September 1942, he received orders to report aboard the Haida once again as the commanding officer where he was responsible for convoy escort duty for ships taking troops and cargo to Alaska. In February 1943 he was directed to report to the Merchant Marine Inspection Office in New York where his duties included those of examining officer and hearing officer. Richmond was promoted to captain 1 June 1943 and in July was transferred to London, England. He was the Senior Coast Guard Officer in charge of the Merchant Marine Hearing Unit where he was responsible for administering and enforcing laws relating to the functions of Coast Guard vessels and personnel. He was also the hearing officer for accidents and casualties involving U.S. naval forces vessels and personnel in Europe. As the senior Coast Guard officer on the staff of the Commander, U.S. Naval Forces in Europe he assisted in the organizing of Coast Guard assets used during Operation Overlord. For his part in planning the invasion, he received the Bronze Star Medal for meritorious service. The French government awarded him the Croix de Guerre "for exceptional services rendered in the liberation of France".

Post-World War II assignments
In May 1945, Richmond was assigned to Coast Guard Headquarters serving as Supply Division Chief, Program Planning Division Chief, Planning and Budgets Division Chief, and Assistant Chief of the Planning and Control Division. During 1948 he undertook the additional assignment of chairing a committee that was charged with considering the recommendations of a study ordered by Congress on how the improve the operation of the Coast Guard and eliminate waste and extravagance. As Chief of the Planning and Control Division in 1949, Richmond was responsible for the response to the recommendations of the Hoover Commission to transfer control of the Coast Guard from the Department of the Treasury to the Department of Commerce. He successfully demonstrated to the commission that there were no gains in economy or efficiency by such an action. On 9 March 1950, President Harry S. Truman appointed Richmond as Assistant Commandant of the Coast Guard with rank of rear admiral. The following year, he was given addition duties as Coast Guard Chief of Staff.

Commandant
Richmond was appointed as Commandant of the Coast Guard by President Dwight D. Eisenhower 13 May 1954 as a vice admiral and took office 1 June, succeeding Vice Admiral Merlin O'Neill. One of his first concerns upon taking office was a proposal by Eisenhower to merge the Coast Guard Academy with the Department of Commerce Merchant Marine Academy. Again, Richmond was able to convince proponents of the move that there were no gains in economy and several impractical features to proposal by citing the differences in the military and commercial aspects of the academies. In 1956 Richmond's staff helped in the formation of the National Search and Rescue Plan which defined the Coast Guard's role and justified further developments in search and rescue (SAR) techniques by used by cutters and aircraft. Other developments during his first term as Commandant included the coordinated use of non Coast Guard resources in oceanic SAR cases and the adoption of Loran-C used for navigation. Because of Richmond's rapport with members of Congress and a desire of the Eisenhower administration to continue improving SAR programs, he was appointed to a second term as Commandant and took office 1 June 1958. Richmond was particularly active with international maritime conferences, representing the United States at the first assembly of the Intergovernmental Maritime Consultative Organization (IMCO) in January 1959 and four other occasions as head of the Maritime Safety Committee of IMCO. In 1960 he was head of the delegation to the Safety of Life at Sea Convention in London, for which services he was awarded the newly inaugurated Coast Guard Distinguished Service Medal. On 1 June 1960, he was promoted to admiral under the authority of Public Law 86-474, which required the Commandant to hold the rank of admiral.  In 1960 he was chosen to preside at the sixth International Lighthouse Conference and as president of the executive committee of the International Association of Lighthouse Authorities. In 1961, Richmond was again a delegate to the second assembly of IMCO as well as chairman of the National Committee for Prevention of Pollution of Seas by Oil.

Retirement and personal life
He moved with his wife, Gretchen Campbell Richmond, to Claremont, California, where he served as a civil defense official for many years. He died of cancer 15 March 1984 at the age of 82 in Claremont and is buried alongside her at Arlington National Cemetery. Richmond was installed in the George Washington University Letterman Hall of Fame in November 1959 honoring his college letter in football. Richmond and his wife Gretchen were parents of two sons, John Mason Richmond and Alfred Carroll Richmond Jr.

Dates of rank

See also

 Rum Patrol

Notes
Footnotes

Citations

References cited

External links
 
 Alfred C. Richmond at ArlingtonCemetery.net, an unofficial website

1902 births
1984 deaths
Commandants of the United States Coast Guard
People from Waterloo, Iowa
People from Arlington County, Virginia
People from Claremont, California
United States Coast Guard personnel of World War II
Burials at Arlington National Cemetery
George Washington University School of Engineering and Applied Science alumni
United States Coast Guard admirals
Deaths from cancer in California
Recipients of the Legion of Merit
Vice Commandants of the United States Coast Guard
Recipients of the Coast Guard Distinguished Service Medal